Ernakulam district in the state of Kerala, India has schools affiliated to the International Baccalaureate (IB), Pearson Education Limited (formerly, Edexcel), the Council for the Indian School Certificate Examinations (CISCE), the Central Board of Secondary Education(CBSE), the National Institute of Open Schooling (NIOS) and the Kerala Board of Public Examinations. Eranakulam District has the most number of schools in Kerala after Trivandrum District followed  three based on the ownership and operational control. Government schools are owned and run by organizations or individuals, but the operations are controlled by the government. Private unaided schools have government control only in academics. The schools are divided into four ed Aluva, Ernakulam, Kothamangalam and Muvattupuzha, each under a District Educational Officer. The district has a total of 88 government schools, 178 privately aided schools and 57 unaided schools. The urban area of Kochi has 34 government schools, 67 private aided schools and 31 unaided schools.

The schools offering the curriculum prepared by CISCE and CBSE follow the syllabi of the respective national organizations. The medium of instruction is English in such schools. There are 128 CBSE schools and 25 CISCE schools in the district. The Kochi urban area has 117 CBSE Schools and 9 CISCE Schools. The Indian Public School (TIPS). Dawn International School and German Metropolitan International School both offer the curricula prepared by Pearson Education Limited (formerly Edexcel) for the IGCSE and GCE ‘A’ level qualifications.

Schools affiliated to the Kerala Board of Public Examinations

Aluva Educational District

Government Schools

Private Aided Schools

Private Unaided Schools

Ernakulam Educational District

Government Schools

Private Aided Schools

Private Unaided Schools

Kothamangalam Educational District

Government Schools

Private Aided Schools

Private Unaided Schools

Muvattupuzha Educational District

Government Schools

Private Aided Schools

Private Unaided Schools

Schools affiliated to the National Institute of Open Schooling (NIOS)

Schools affiliated to the Central Board of Secondary Education (CBSE)

Schools affiliated to the Council for the Indian School Certificate Examinations (CISCE)

Schools offering International Curricula

References

External links 
 Government of Kerala, department of General Education
 Central Board of Secondary Education
 Council for the Indian School Certificate Examinations

Schools
Ernakulam schools
Ernakulam